Paul Marie (born 24 March 1995) is a French professional footballer who plays as a right-back for Major League Soccer club San Jose Earthquakes.

Career

College 
Born in Saint-Aubin-des-Bois, France, Marie moved to the United States as a teenager to attend college. He began at Newberry College in 2014, where he played one season of Division II soccer for the Wolves. He scored four goals and added one assist during sixteen appearances, and received an all-South Atlantic Conference honorable mention.

Marie transferred to Florida International University in 2015, where he studied sports management. He played three seasons of Division I soccer for the Panthers, registering 14 goals and 14 assists in 52 appearances. Eight of these goals and six of these assists came during 17 appearances his senior season in 2017, earning him Third Team All-America, First Team All-Southeast Region and First Team All-Conference USA honors.

Professional
On 10 January 2018, Marie was selected 12th overall by the San Jose Earthquakes during the 2018 MLS SuperDraft. San Jose general manager Jesse Fioranelli described Marie as "an offensive-minded outside back that has technical qualities and the ability to read the game", which motivated his choice as San Jose's first draft pick. He was officially signed by the club on 16 March 2018, and immediately sent on loan to San Jose's USL affiliate Reno 1868 FC, alongside fellow SuperDraft picks Danny Musovski and Mohamed Thiaw.

Career Statistics

Honors

Collegiate
 2014 Honorable Mention All-South Athletic Conference
 2016 Second Team All-Southeast Region
 2016 First Team All-Conference USA
 2017 Third Team All-America
 2017 First Team All-Southeast Region
 2017 First Team All-Conference USA

References

External links

FIU bio

1995 births
Living people
American soccer players
French footballers
FIU Panthers men's soccer players
France youth international footballers
Stade Malherbe Caen players
Sportspeople from Calvados (department)
Reading United A.C. players
San Jose Earthquakes players
Reno 1868 FC players
Association football defenders
Soccer players from Florida
San Jose Earthquakes draft picks
USL League Two players
Major League Soccer players
USL Championship players
Newberry College alumni
Footballers from Normandy